Stenalia obscuripennis is a beetle in the genus Stenalia of the family Mordellidae. It was described in 1955 by Ermisch.

References

obscuripennis
Beetles described in 1955